Plainfield,  a town in Washington County, Vermont, United States was incorporated in 1867. The population was 1,236 at the 2020 census. Plainfield is the location of Goddard College.

Geography

According to the United States Census Bureau, the town has a total area of 21.0 square miles (54.5 km2), of which 21.0 square miles (54.4 km2) is land and 0.04 square mile (0.1 km2) (0.19%) is water.

Plainfield, the primary village, is located in the northern corner of the town along the Winooski River and U.S. Route 2. Goddard College is located just west of the village. The ground rises to the east in the town, culminating at  Spruce Mountain within Groton State Forest.

Demographics

As of the census of 2000, there were 1,286 people, 487 households, and 317 families residing in the town. The population density was 61.2 people per square mile (23.6/km2). There were 520 housing units at an average density of 24.8 per square mile (9.6/km2). The racial makeup of the town was 96.42% White, 0.78% African American, 0.86% Native American, 0.47% Asian, 0.39% from other races, and 1.09% from two or more races. Hispanic or Latino of any race were 1.40% of the population.

There were 487 households, out of which 37.0% had children under the age of 18 living with them, 48.9% were couples living together and joined in either marriage or civil union, 10.9% had a female householder with no husband present, and 34.9% were non-families. 25.7% of all households were made up of individuals, and 8.2% had someone living alone who was 65 years of age or older. The average household size was 2.42 and the average family size was 2.93.

In the town, the population was spread out, with 23.7% under the age of 18, 12.9% from 18 to 24, 28.8% from 25 to 44, 24.4% from 45 to 64, and 10.1% who were 65 years of age or older. The median age was 36 years. For every 100 females, there were 94.3 males. For every 100 females age 18 and over, there were 90.1 males.

The median income for a household in the town was $38,750, and the median income for a family was $42,813. Males had a median income of $30,789 versus $29,750 for females. The per capita income for the town was $17,980. About 7.6% of families and 10.9% of the population were below the poverty line, including 9.2% of those under age 18 and 17.5% of those age 65 or over.

Culture

Although Plainfield is similar to many other rural New England towns by the numbers (size, population, etc.), it has a distinct flair which sets it apart from most surrounding communities. Goddard College attracts a liberal, educated population that at one time made up a significant portion of the townspeople. Goddard alumni include Mumia Abu-Jamal, members of the band Phish, David Mamet, Piers Anthony, Mary Edwards, onetime State historian H. Allen Soule Jr., and abstract artists including Robert M. Fisher and James Gahagan. Plainfield was home to noted composer and builder of the first American village style gamelan, Dennis Murphy. J.Willis Pratt is still alive.

The town currently has two restaurants; one located in the village center with New York-style pizza, and the other a cafe on US Route 2. The village also has a community food co-op and community center open to non-members and featuring local products, a used bookshop, and a community maintained flower garden, all within several hundred feet of each other.  The town has a unique public library, the Cutler Memorial Library, and is home to an environmentally progressive biodiesel station. Plainfield is also home to the historic Allenwood Farm.

Plainfield's atmosphere is distinct from popular tourist destinations in Vermont such as Stowe, and Woodstock in that its commercial activity is generated primarily by local residents. There are a number of active local groups such as the Plainfield Historical Society and the Plainfield Area Community Association, which sponsor community activities, like the annual Old Home Days.

Plainfield, like a number of Vermont towns, retains the influence of the back-to-the-land movement of the 1960s. A number of people came to stay for good and continue to run organic farms. This older generation has now joined with the newer, younger sustainable agriculture movement and the food renaissance in Vermont. While the college, Goddard, has suffered a decline in recent years, the town nevertheless retains an ethos of activism, community and solidarity (except on Town Meeting day when everyone voices their opinion loudly). Community spirit and solidarity was demonstrated in 2013, when the town raised the most money per capita for Vermont Public Radio and thus earned an Ice Cream Social from Ben and Jerry's. The radio station housed at Goddard College, WGDR, continues to serve as a community voice and link for area residents. The newly renovated Plainfield Town Hall Opera House boasts a footprint of 55' 9" along the eaves, 42' 4" across the gables, and is a popular destination for local concerts and performances.

Government 

Plainfield's board of selectmen is made up of three members (2021):

 Sasha Thayer
 Tammy Farnham
 Jim Volz

Notable people 

 Trey Anastasio, musician, lead vocalist for Phish
 Piers Anthony, writer in the science fiction and fantasy genres
 Mary Azarian, woodcut artist and children's book illustrator
 Robert M. Fisher, artist 
 James Gahagan, artist 
 William H. Macy, actor, teacher, and director, in theater, film, and television
 David Mamet, playwright, screenwriter, director, poet, essayist and novelist 
 Page McConnell, pianist, organist, and keyboardist for Phish
 Dennis Murphy, composer, musician, instrument maker and artist
 Archie Shepp, jazz saxophonist
 Thomas Yamamoto, artist

The village of Plainfield, Wisconsin was named by its postmaster Elijah C. Waterman to honor his hometown of Plainfield, Vermont.

References

External links
 

 
Towns in Vermont
Towns in Washington County, Vermont
1867 establishments in Vermont
Populated places established in 1867